There have been two "Rockingham Clubs"

The original Rockingham Club (founded 1753)
This was founded in York, England and had its first meeting on 23 December 1753 in the George Inn, York.

It was named after 'Lord Rockingham' (Charles Watson-Wentworth, 2nd Marquess of Rockingham, KG, PC (13 May 1730 – 1 July 1782)),  who during his term of office as British Prime Minister repealed the Stamp Act, reducing the tax burden on the American colonies.  Rockingham also backed the claim for American independence and in 1782, when he was appointed Prime Minister for a second time, upon taking office he acknowledged the independence of the United States, initiating an end to British involvement in the Revolutionary War.

Members included:
 John Carr (architect)
 Michael McQueeney

The Yale University 'Rockingham Club' (1981-1986)
The Yale Rockingham Club was a Yale University student club founded by British-born Yale undergraduate Lord Nicholas Hervey, a descendant of Lord Rockingham, as a social club for Yale student descendants of royalty or aristocracy, a requirement later modified to allow membership by offspring of the "super-wealthy." 

The club survived five years (1981–1986) and the clubhouse (privately purchased by a small group of members including Hervey and Salem Chalabi) was an off-campus historic clapboard building housing a full-length portrait of Hervey (who took six years to graduate), as well as a ballroom and chandelier, and where parties were held.

See also
List of Yale University student organizations
Charles Watson-Wentworth, 2nd Marquess of Rockingham

Sources 
NY Times Article on Rockingham Club at Yale
February 1986 Interview Magazine Article on Rockingham Club
Iovine, Juli V. Lipsticks and Lords: Yale's New Look, in The Wall Street Journal, 4 August 1987, p. 1.

Yale University
Student societies in the United States